Mylly (lit. mill) is a shopping centre in Raisio, Finland. Mylly was opened in October 2001 and in 2008 the annual sales was 167 million euros. The shopping centre was expanded in 2016, adding an additional section containing a number of businesses.

External links 

Shopping centres in Raisio
Shopping malls established in 2001
Tourist attractions in Southwest Finland